The Cotati Jazz Festival is an annual music festival held in Cotati, California, United States, since 1981. It typically takes place mid-June. Since 2006, admission has been free.

This festival went virtual in 2020.

31st annual Cotati Jazz Festival (2011)
Held on Saturday, June 18, 2011 from noon to 7 p.m.

The lineup included the following artists and bands:
 The Gomez Counter Band
 Keith Andrew Band
 Gumbo West
 Tracy Rose Trio & Pamela Hamilton
 Tumbao
 One World Band
 Jazz Roots
 Chris Miano
 Dick Conte Jazz Quartet

30th annual Cotati Jazz & Antiques Festival (2010)
Held on Saturday, June 19, 2010 from noon to 7 p.m.

The lineup included the following artists and bands:
 The Susan Comstock Quintet
 Rotten Tomatoes
 Soul Shine Band
 Keith Andrew Band
 Strange Brew
 Still Smooth
 Simply Amazing
 Sunday at Ed’s
 Chris Miano Band
 Jazz Roots
 Dan Castro Group (bass clarinet)

28th annual Cotati Jazz Blues & Arts Festival (2008)
Held on Saturday, June 14, 2008 from noon to midnight.  The theme was "Swing Baby, Swing." Free admission. 50% of net profits were pledged to the Rancho Cotate Music Boosters.

The lineup included the following artists and local bands:
 The Keith Andrew Band
 The Blues Defenders
 The Blues Revue
 The Defenders
 Tony Gagarin
 Robert Gastelum
 Gumbo West
 Himalaya
 Jazz Roots
 Moonlighters
 The Pyrotones
 Tracy Rose Quartet
 Stompy Jones
 Jeffrey Suttles
 Swing Fever
 The Thugz
 Tumbao

27th annual Cotati Jazz, Blues & Arts Festival (2007)
In 2007, the event was subtitled A Salute to New Orleans, and pledged 50% of its net profits to Hurricane Katrina relief. Held on Saturday, June 16, 2007 from noon to 6 p.m., its lineup included:
Fourth Street Jazz Band
Justis Jones
Gumbo West
Christopher Ford
Music to My Ears Jazz Ensemble
Bob Logan
Miano Jarab
Stewart Potter
Allegria Latin Jazz, and
Erstwhile Medicine Show.

26th annual Cotati Jazz Blues and Art Festival (2006)
Held on Saturday, June 17, 2006 from noon to midnight, admission was free.  The venues included:
La Plaza Park
Cotati Creek Cafe
Dos Amigos Restaurant,
Spancky’s Bar
Sweet Lou’s Trattoria
The Tradewinds
Oliver’s Market, and
Redwood Cafe.

25th annual Cotati Jazz Blues and Arts Festival (2005)
Held on Saturday, June 18, 2005 from noon to midnight, its lineup included:
Blue Moon
Stompy Jones
Donna Arvidson Band
Willie & T-Bone
Fiasco
Tombao
Stragglerz
Ian Scherer Quartet
Mike Martinez Latin Jazz Band, and
One World Band.

Admission was $10 adults; free for youngsters under age 12.

24th annual Cotati Jazz Festival (2004)
Held on Saturday June 19, 2004 from noon to 9 p.m., it included more than forty artists.  Admission was $10.

23rd annual Cotati Jazz Festival (2003)
Held on Sunday, June 15, 2003 from noon to 9 p.m, its venues included:
La Plaza Park
Dos Amigos Restaurant
The Tradewinds, and
Sweet Lou's Family Trattoria.

22nd annual Cotati Jazz Festival (2002)
Held on June 15–16, 2002 from 1 p.m. to 6 p.m.

21st annual Cotati Jazz Festival (2001)
Held on June 16–17, 2001.  Admission was $15 for one day, $25 for both.

20th annual Cotati Jazz Festival (2000)
Held on June 17–18, 2000.  Artists appearing included:
 Kenny Stahl

19th annual Cotati Jazz Festival (1999)
Held on June 19–20, 1999. Admission was $15 for one day, $25 for both.

16th annual Cotati Jazz Festival (1996)
Organized by Jud Snyder, the 1996 festival was held on June 15–16, 1996 from 1 p.m. to 6 p.m. Admission was $12 for one day, $20 for both days. The theme was "Women in Music," and featured performers included:
Madeline Eastman
Joyce Cooling
Madeline Duran
Dottie Dodgion
Benny Barth
Bud Spangler
Mel Graves
Lisa Carr

Previous years
 A Cotati Jazz Festival was held 1–6 p.m. on June 27–28, 1981 and featured a Bobby Hutcherson quartet. Admission cost $8 for both days.
 The 4th annual Cotati Jazz Festival was held on June 2–3, 1984.
 The 7th annual Cotati Jazz Festival was held on June 13–14, 1987.
 The 8th annual Cotati Jazz Festival was held on June 11–12, 1988.
 The 9th annual Cotati Jazz Festival was held on June 17–18, 1989.
 The 11th annual Cotati Jazz Festival was held on June 15–16, 1991.
 The 12th annual Cotati Jazz Festival was held in June 1991 and lasted two days.
 The 15th annual Cotati Jazz Festival was held on June 17–18, 1995. Admission cost $22 for both days.
 The 41st in 2020 marked the first time the festival went virtual. Coverage was pre-recorded or live-streamed.

See also

List of San Francisco Bay Area festivals and fairs

References

External links
Official website

Festivals in the San Francisco Bay Area
Jazz festivals in California
Music of the San Francisco Bay Area
Tourist attractions in Sonoma County, California
Recurring events established in 1980
Music venues in California
1980 establishments in California